Leontius Theotokites, (? – after 1190) was Ecumenical Patriarch of Constantinople from February/March to September/October 1189.

References

Bibliography 
 
 .

12th-century patriarchs of Constantinople
12th-century births